is a railway station on Kintetsu Kashihara Line in Yamatokōriyama, Nara, Japan.

Lines 
 Kintetsu Railway
 Kashihara Line

Platforms and tracks 
The station has two side platforms serving one track each.

History 
The station opened in 1921 on the Unebi Line of Osaka Electric Tramway, a predecessor of the Kintetsu Railway.

Surrounding 
 Kōriyama Castle

External links
 
 

Railway stations in Japan opened in 1921
Railway stations in Nara Prefecture